Franceschino Malaspina was the lord of Castiglione del Terziere and son of Moroello Malaspina, a black Guelf captain.  In 1306 he gave Dante refuge there.  Franceschino then sent Dante as an ambassador to Sarzana.

Sources
The Nation, 1891, article on Dante
Britannica, 15th Edition (1982), Vol. VII, p. 525.

14th-century rulers in Europe
Year of birth missing
Year of death missing